Ouret is a genus of flowering plants in the amaranth family Amaranthaceae, found in Africa, Madagascar, many of the Indian Ocean islands, the Arabian Peninsula, the Indian Subcontinent, Sri Lanka, Southeast Asia, Indonesia, New Guinea, China (including Hainan and Taiwan), and the Philippines.

Species
Currently accepted species include:
Ouret congesta (Balf.f. ex Baker) Kuntze
Ouret coriacea (Schinz) T.Hammer
Ouret glabrata (Hook.f.) Kuntze
Ouret humbertii (Cavaco) T.Hammer
Ouret lanata (L.) Kuntze
Ouret leucura (Moq.) Kuntze
Ouret sanguinolenta (L.) Kuntze
Ouret triangularifolia (Cavaco) T.Hammer

References

Amaranthaceae
Amaranthaceae genera